Tovidarreh (also Romanized as Ţovīdarreh) is a village in Kelardasht-e Gharbi Rural District, Kelardasht District, Chalus County, Mazandaran Province, Iran. During the 2006 census, its population was 659, in 190 families.

References 

Populated places in Chalus County